Roystonea maisiana is a species of palm which is endemic to the Maisí region of Guantánamo Province in eastern Cuba.

Description
Individuals have about 15 leaves with  rachises; the leaves hang well horizontal. The  inflorescences bear white male and female flowers.

References

Trees of Cuba
maisiana
Vulnerable plants